Statistics of SEGAS Championship in the 1911–12 season.

Overview
Goudi Athens won the championship.

References

 

Panhellenic Championship seasons
Greece
1911–12 in Greek football